Durankaya is a village in the Şirvan District of Siirt Province in Turkey. The village had a population of 548 in 2021.

The hamlets of Ozdoğan, Sevinç and Sevindik are attached to the village.

References 

Kurdish settlements in Siirt Province
Villages in Şirvan District